Szergény is a village in Vas county, Hungary. It is about 84 miles (135 km) west of Budapest. There are a few UNESCO World Heritage sites not far, including the Millenary Benedictine Abbey of Pannonhalma which is about 29 miles (46 km) away.

References

Populated places in Vas County